Béduer (Languedocien: Beduèr) is a commune in the Lot department in southwestern France.

Pilgrimage
Béduer is situated on the Via Podiensis route that is followed by those making the pilgrimage to Santiago de Compostella and so receives pilgrims arriving from the town of Figeac.

From Béduer pilgrims continue on either to the Notre-Dame de l'Assomption church at Gréalou, reaching the river Lot at Cajarc, or follow the course of the river Célé to its confluence with the Lot, passing by the convent at Espagnac-Sainte-Eulalie.

History
The town was formerly owned by the Lostanges family. Its control of the land between the Lot and Célé rivers put it on a par with the Abbey at Figeac.

Population

Sights
The Château de Barasc, situated on a ridge dates from the twelfth century and has been successively renovated over the ages. It was home to the Barasc family, one of whom, Gerald V, was Bishop of Cahors between 1237 and 1250.

Personalities
 Henri Descremps (born 1 April 1746 in Béduer; died around 1826 in Paris) was an 18th-century French magician who described his art in a famous book, La Magie blanche dévoilée (1784).
 Augustin Boutaric (born 12 August 1885 in Béduer; died 1949 in Dijon) was noted physician and chemist.

See also
Communes of the Lot department

References

External links

Béduer website

Communes of Lot (department)